The Yountville AVA is an American Viticultural Area located within Napa Valley AVA and centered on the town Yountville, California.  The town's founder George Calvert Yount planted the first vineyard in this area around 1836.  Yountville AVA is one of the coolest wine regions in Napa Valley, which helps contribute to a long growing season. The area is particularly known for its very tannic Cabernet Sauvignon varietal wines that have the capability of aging well in the bottle.

References

American Viticultural Areas of the San Francisco Bay Area
Napa Valley
Yountville, California
Geography of Napa County, California
1999 establishments in California
American Viticultural Areas